The New Zealand Association of Psychotherapists Te Rōpū Whakaora Hinengaro (NZAP) is a professional associations for psychotherapists in New Zealand.

History

The college was established in 1947 at a meeting in Christchurch by Maurice Bevan-Brown, as a way to promote psychoanalysis as a way to address New Zealand's high rate of admissions to mental hospitals. In the following year, the association helped establish the first university course in psychological medicine and psychotherapy in New Zealand, held at Canterbury University College.

See also

References

External links
 Official website

1947 establishments in New Zealand
Psychotherapy organizations
Mental health organisations in New Zealand
Organizations established in 1947
Professional associations based in New Zealand